Vladislav Gennadyevich Baskov (born 20 December 1975) is a former Russian football midfielder.

Club career
He played 6 seasons in the Russian Football National League for 5 different teams.

External links
 

Living people
1975 births
Russian footballers
Russian expatriate footballers
Expatriate footballers in China
Expatriate footballers in Latvia
FC Zenit Saint Petersburg players
FK Ventspils players
FC Fakel Voronezh players
Shanghai Shenhua F.C. players
Association football midfielders
Russian expatriate sportspeople in China
Russian expatriate sportspeople in Latvia
FC Sodovik Sterlitamak players
FC Arsenal Tula players
FC Dynamo Saint Petersburg players